The Epson Tour Championship is an annual golf tournament for professional women golfers on the Epson Tour, the LPGA's developmental tour. The event was played at LPGA International in Daytona Beach, Florida from 2008 to 2019, except for 2016. In 2008 and 2009 the tournament was played on the Jones Course. Beginning in 2010, it has been played on the Champions Course. The 2016 event was played at Alaqua Country Club in Longwood, Florida due to course conditions at LPGA International caused by Hurricane Matthew. In 2020, the event moved to River Run Country Club in Davidson, North Carolina.

The tournament is a 72-hole event, as are most tour events, and includes pre-tournament pro-am opportunities, in which local amateur golfers can play with the professional golfers from the Tour as a benefit for local charities. For professionals, it is a final chance to get into the top ten on the tour's money list and earn an LPGA Tour card, or at least improve their status for LPGA Tour Qualifying School. The current benefiting charity of the Epson Tour Championship is the Boys & Girls Clubs of Volusia and Flagler Counties.

Winners

Tournament records

References

External links
Coverage on Epson Tour's official site

Symetra Tour events
Golf in Florida
Golf in North Carolina
Recurring sporting events established in 2008
2008 establishments in Florida